Intricatotrypanius intricatus is a species of beetle in the family Cerambycidae, and the only species in the genus Intricatotrypanius. It was described by Gressitt in 1956.

References

Acanthocinini
Beetles described in 1956
Monotypic beetle genera